Pantoporia bieti, the Tytler's lascar, is a species of nymphalid butterfly found in tropical and subtropical Asia. The species is named in recognition of Félix Biet a French missionary who collected butterflies for Charles Oberthur.

References

Pantoporia
Butterflies of Asia
Butterflies of Indochina
Butterflies described in 1894